West Elizabeth is a borough in Allegheny County, Pennsylvania, United States. The population was 403 at the 2020 census.

Geography
West Elizabeth is located at  (40.272901, -79.894918).

Surrounding and adjacent neighborhoods
Situated along the Monongahela River, West Elizabeth is surrounded by Jefferson Hills.  Across the river, West Elizabeth runs adjacent with the borough of Elizabeth and has a direct connector via Malady Bridge.

History
The town was initially laid out in 1833, and incorporated March 3, 1848. West Elizabeth was a coal mining and boat-building town.  Coal was transported by barge down the Monongahela River to industries in Pittsburgh.  Coal was transported from the mine to the river by Walton's Coal Incline and the O'Neil and Company Incline.

Demographics

As of the census of 2000, there were 565 people, 247 households, and 153 families residing in the borough. The population density was 2,764.6 people per square mile (1,090.7/km2). There were 279 housing units at an average density of 1,365.2 per square mile (538.6/km2). The racial makeup of the borough was 99.29% White, 0.18% African American, 0.35% Asian, and 0.18% from two or more races.

There were 247 households, out of which 28.3% had children under the age of 18 living with them, 38.1% were married couples living together, 17.4% had a female householder with no husband present, and 37.7% were non-families. 34.0% of all households were made up of individuals, and 13.0% had someone living alone who was 65 years of age or older. The average household size was 2.29 and the average family size was 2.92.

In the borough the population was spread out, with 22.5% under the age of 18, 7.6% from 18 to 24, 31.2% from 25 to 44, 21.9% from 45 to 64, and 16.8% who were 65 years of age or older. The median age was 37 years. For every 100 females, there were 86.5 males. For every 100 females age 18 and over, there were 84.8 males.

The median income for a household in the borough was $26,339, and the median income for a family was $32,500. Males had a median income of $36,667 versus $19,712 for females. The per capita income for the borough was $14,687. About 9.4% of families and 15.5% of the population were below the poverty line, including 22.1% of those under age 18 and 13.1% of those age 65 or over.

Government and politics

References

Populated places established in 1833
Pittsburgh metropolitan area
Boroughs in Allegheny County, Pennsylvania
Pennsylvania populated places on the Monongahela River
1848 establishments in Pennsylvania